Namsrai Baatartsogt (born 21 November 1998) is a Mongolian footballer who plays as a forward for Mongolian Premier League club Ulaanbaatar City and the Mongolian national team.

Club career
Through the 2019 season, Baatartsogt played for Soyombiin Baarsuud of the Mongolian First League. That season he was the league's top scorer with twenty seven goals and was given the league's Best Forward Award. Baatartsogt was a nominee for Best Male Player at the annual MFF Golden Ball Awards following the season. 

He moved to Khovd Western FC for the 2020 campaign. A season later he was again the league's top scorer with eighteen goals and named the league's best forward as Khovd Western finished third in the table.

Prior to the 2021 Mongolian Premier League season, Baatartsogt joined Ulaanbaatar City FC on a 4-year contract. He finished his first season with the club tied for sixth in the league with nine goals.

International career
Baatartsogt made his senior international debut on 8 June 2022 in a 2023 AFC Asian Cup qualification match against Palestine.

International statistics

References

External links

1998 births
Living people
Mongolian footballers
Association football forwards
Mongolia international footballers
Ulaanbaatar City FC players
Tuv Buganuud FC players
Mongolian National Premier League players